The Camden Yards Sports Complex is located in the center of Baltimore, Maryland. The complex is composed of multiple buildings and stadiums including Oriole Park at Camden Yards and M&T Bank Stadium. The two stadiums are home to the Baltimore Orioles of Major League Baseball and the Baltimore Ravens of the National Football League. The complex still houses the recently closed Sports Legends Museum at Camden Yards (a non-profit museum featuring Maryland sports teams). Along with the Sports Legends Museum, the Babe Ruth Birthplace and Museum is located approximately two blocks from the main entrance of  Camden Yards at Eutaw Street. Geppi's Entertainment Museum is also located in Camden Station, atop the Sports Legends at Camden Yards. In addition to the sports facilities, it is also a location for community events such as the Dew Tour's Panasonic Open in June 2007 and 2008, the Baltimore Marathon, and the African American Festival which is held every year.

M&T Bank Stadium 

M&T Bank Stadium is home to the Baltimore Ravens football franchise located at 1101 Russell Street. The Ravens franchise returned the NFL to Baltimore in 1996 when the Cleveland Browns announced their intention to move. The stadium was completed in 1998 at an estimated cost of $220 million. The stadium itself is 185 ft. high.  It hosts numerous concerts and sporting events like the NCAA Men's Lacrosse Championship (2010, 2011, 2014), The U2 Concert (2011), The Men's Lacrosse Face-Off Classic (2010,2011,2012), Monster Jam, the Tottenham vs. Liverpool friendly (2012), the CONCACAF Gold Cup Quarterfinals (2013, 2015), The Jay-Z and Justin Timberlake concert (2013), the Jay-Z and Beyoncé concert (2014), and the Billy Joel concert (2015). The stadium is also LEED (Leadership in Energy and Environmental Design) Certified, being the first existing outdoor professional sports facility in the United States to do so. The stadium offers scenic views of the Baltimore city skyline. There are 71,008 available seats, much more than its sister ball park, Oriole Park. There are also 8,196 club seats located in 128 different suites. Each suite holds between 20 and 24 people and offers VIP parking, access to club lounges, fully staffed bars, concierge services, private restrooms, personal wait staff, and scenic views of downtown Baltimore.

Sports Legends Museum at Camden Yards 

The Sports Legends Museum was located at the Camden Yards Sports Complex in Baltimore, Maryland. The museum was opened to the public on May 14, 2005, with the hopes of maintaining and commemorating the historic significance of Maryland's past and present sports teams. It was privately owned by The Babe Ruth Birthplace Foundation until October 12, 2015. The Sports Legends Museum is seeking a new location (in Baltimore) in order to preserve the history and legacy of Babe Ruth, the Baltimore's Orioles, Ravens, and Colts, as well as local and regional sports at the amateur, collegiate and professional levels. The museum's collection can be priced at over $3.2 million in sport memorabilia.

The museum was constructed at the Camden Station which used to be a stop on the B&O Railroad. Constructed between 1856 and 1857 this railroad stop served both passenger and freight trains. Even president Abraham Lincoln traveled through Camden Station on his way to his inauguration, and his final trip on his own funeral train. Since being closed in the 1980s, the Sports Legend Museum occupied the space until its location had been moved. The recent tenant in Camden Station is Geppi's Entertainment Museum, which closed on June 3, 2018. The Camden Station is currently left vacant.

Babe Ruth Birthplace and Museum

Birthplace 
Babe Ruth was born in 1895 to parents George Sr. and Kate in Baltimore, MD, in a house near the site of the original Orioles ballpark, today known as Oriole Park at Camden Yards. His childhood home is located in the old Ridgley's Delight neighborhood close to the Inner Harbor. The house became a tourist attraction in the early 1980s to preserve its history. A local group of Babe Ruth fans and Baltimore historians took action to have the city support a museum in Babe's honor, after almost being demolished in the early 1970s. In 1973, Babe Ruth Birthplace Foundation opened a non-profit museum to the public in honor of Babe Ruth's Birthplace.

Museum 
The Babe Ruth Museum has been run by Mike Gibbons, the Executive Director, for 23 years. The collection continued to grow through the 1990s. The museum houses a collection of artifacts from Ruth's life, including some rare baseball cards and the earliest known signature of Ruth, from when he was still pitching in the schoolyard. The original museum underwent renovations to increase space, improve accessibility, and enhance the overall facility in 2006.

Events

Dew Tour 

The Dew Tour has two separate events: summer and winter. The Dew Tour gives street skiers, skaters, snowboarders, etc., the chance to participate with mainstream contenders. This is a chance that street contenders have not had before, and it gives skiers a chance to participate in the Winter Olympics. The Panasonic Dew Tour held in 2007 offered a total of $2.5 million in prizes.

Baltimore Marathon 

The Camden Yards Sports Complex is home of the Baltimore Marathon, which is arguably "one of the best races on the east coast." In 2016, the race will start on October 15 and features a variety of different races. The Baltimore Marathon includes the full marathon, half marathon, team relay, 5K, kid's fun run, and the BaltiMORON-a-Thon. People of all ages can participate in specific events (according to age) and prices range from $15 to $280. The race began in 2001, and still follows the same course as the original race. It begins at Oriole Park at Camden Yards then winds its way through the streets of Baltimore passing by the Inner Harbor, Fells Point, Patterson Park, and many other sites in the city, ending in the same spot it began. The race is a total of 26.219 miles long. At the finish line in 2012, both the male and female winners received a prize of $25,000. The race has greatly evolved from the first Maryland Marathon in 1973.

African American Festival 

The Camden Yards Sports Complex is also home to the African American Festival (or Afram). The African American Festival is a social gathering of the people of Baltimore where they come to celebrate African American music and culture. The festival is filled with various artists including poets, singers, rappers, entrepreneurs and other performers. The African American Festival has been taking place since 1976 and has featured appearances from people such as Ray Lewis, Vivica A. Fox, Elise Neal, Traci Braxton, the rapper Common, and much more. There is fun and games for children to participate in and everyone enjoys the family oriented vibe. It is one of the largest cultural events on the east coast and welcomes more than 350,000 people annually every summer. There is usually more than 150 vendors and two stages for entertainment. The African American Festival is a huge attraction each year.

References

Sports venues in Baltimore
Sports complexes in the United States